Jason Eric Dawe (born May 29, 1973) is a Canadian former professional ice hockey player.

Early life
Dawe was born in North York and grew up in Scarborough. As a youth, Dawe played in the 1987 Quebec International Pee-Wee Hockey Tournament with the Toronto Young Nationals minor ice hockey team.

Dawe played his junior hockey career with the Peterborough Petes of the Ontario Hockey League, where he compiled 337 points in 241 games and was part of the Petes' Memorial Cup finalist in 1993. During the same season, Dawe joined Team Canada for the 1993 World Junior Championships, where he scored six points in seven games on the way to earning a gold medal.

Career 
Dawe was drafted in the second round, 35th overall, by the Buffalo Sabres in the 1991 NHL Entry Draft.

Dawe split the 1993–94 season between the Sabres and their AHL affiliate, the Rochester Americans, scoring 28 goals in 80 combined games. Following the lockout shortened 1994-95 season, Dawe made the jump to full-time NHL status. In 1995–96, Dawe enjoyed his finest statistical season, compiling 25 goals in 67 games.

Dawe played two more seasons with the Sabres, amassing 81 points in 149 games, before being traded to the New York Islanders near the 1998 trade deadline for left wing Paul Kruse and defenseman Jason Holland. Dawe went on to score just seven more goals in parts of four National Hockey League seasons with the Islanders, Montreal Canadiens and New York Rangers.

During these final seasons in the NHL, Dawe also saw time in the minor leagues, playing for the Milwaukee Admirals of the IHL (1999–2000) and Hartford Wolfpack (1999–2002), Worcester IceCats (2002–2003), and a return stint with the Rochester Americans (2003–2004) of the American Hockey League.

Dawe also skated 15 games for Kärpät of Finland's SM-liiga during the 2003–04 season. His last professional games came during the 2004–05 season with the Charlotte Checkers of the ECHL.

Career statistics

References

External links

1973 births
Living people
Buffalo Sabres draft picks
Buffalo Sabres players
Canadian ice hockey right wingers
Hartford Wolf Pack players
Oulun Kärpät players
Milwaukee Admirals (IHL) players
Montreal Canadiens players
New York Islanders players
New York Rangers players
Sportspeople from North York
Ice hockey people from Toronto
Sportspeople from Scarborough, Toronto
Peterborough Petes (ice hockey) players
Rochester Americans players
Worcester IceCats players
Canadian expatriate ice hockey players in Finland